The Revolution of 1897 was an uprising led by the army of the Uruguayan National Party against the government of President Juan Idiarte Borda. It took place in Uruguayan territory between March 5 and September 18, 1897.

History 
The revolutionary movement was led by the Caudillo Aparicio Saravia, and the General Diego Lamas, who arrived at the Banda Oriental from Buenos Aires, together with the so-called "22 de Lamas", among which was Lieutenant Colonel Isabelino Canaveris. On March 17, 1897, took place the Battle of the Tres Arboles (department Río Negro), where the forces of General Diego Lamas defeated the army of Colonel José Villar. 

One of the causes of the conflict was electoral fraud denounced by leaders of the National Party, who demanded greater transparency in the elections. After several months of conflict, a peace agreement was signed on September 18, 1897.

References 

Battles involving Uruguay
Conflicts in 1897